The 1982 UCI Track Cycling World Championships were the World Championship for track cycling. They took place in Leicester, the United Kingdom in 1982. Fourteen events were contested, 12 for men (5 for professionals, 7 for amateurs) and 2 for women.

Medal summary

Medal table

References

Track cycling
UCI Track Cycling World Championships by year
Sport in Leicester
1982 in track cycling
1980s in Leicestershire
International cycle races hosted by England